Thomas F. O'Neill (1890–1974) was an American art director.

Selected filmography
 The Last Performance (1927)
 The Man Who Laughs (1928)
 Broadway (1929)
 The Unexpected Father (1932)
 Destry Rides Again (1932)
 Saturday's Millions (1933)
 Gordon of Ghost City (1933)
 The Affair of Susan (1935)
 Storm Over the Andes (1935)

References

Bibliography
 Bradley, Edwin M. The First Hollywood Musicals: A Critical Filmography of 171 Features, 1927 through 1932. McFarland, 2004.

External links

1890 births
1974 deaths
American art directors
People from Brooklyn